Martin Cruz Smith (born November 3, 1942) is an American mystery novelist. He is best known for his nine-novel series (to date) on Russian investigator Arkady Renko, who was first introduced in 1981 with Gorky Park.

Early life and education
Martin William Smith was born in Reading, Pennsylvania to John Calhoun Smith, jazz musician and Louise Lopez, an American Indian of Pueblo descent, jazz singer, teacher, Amerindian rights militant, and Miss New Mexico in 1939. Martin was educated at Germantown Academy, in Germantown Philadelphia, Pennsylvania, then at the University of Pennsylvania, also located in Philadelphia, and received a Bachelor of Arts degree in creative writing in 1964. He is of partly Pueblo, Spanish, Senecu del Sur and Yaqui ancestry.

Career
From 1965 to 1969, Smith worked as a journalist and began writing fiction in the early 1970s. He wrote two Slocum adult action Western novels under the pen name Jake Logan. Smith has also written a number of other paperback originals, including a series about a character named "The Inquisitor", a James Bond-type agent employed by the Vatican; and a science fiction novel, The Indians Won. Smith wrote three novels in the Nick Carter series.

Canto for a Gypsy, his third novel overall and the second to feature Roman Grey, a gypsy art dealer in New York City, was nominated for an Edgar Award.

Nightwing (1977), also an Edgar nominee, was his breakthrough novel, and he adapted it for a feature film of the same name (1979).

Smith is best known for his novels featuring Russian investigator Arkady Renko whom Smith introduced in Gorky Park (1981). The novel, which was called the "first thriller of the '80s" by Time, became a bestseller and won a Gold Dagger Award from the British Crime Writers' Association. Renko has since appeared in eight other novels by Smith. Gorky Park debuted at No. 2 on the "New York Times" bestseller list on April 26, 1981 and hung onto the top spot for another week. It stayed in the No. 2 position for over three months, beaten only by James Clavell's Noble House. It stayed in the top 15 through November of that year. Polar Star also claimed the No. 1 spot for two weeks on August 6, 1989. It subsequently held the No. 2 spot for over two months.

During the 1990s, Smith twice won the Dashiell Hammett Award from the North American Branch of the International Association of Crime Writers. The first time was for Rose in 1996; the second time was for Havana Bay in 1999. And on September 5, 2010, he and Arkady Renko returned to the New York Times bestseller list when Three Stations debuted at No. 7 on the fiction bestsellers list.  His most recent novel featuring Renko is "The Siberian Dilemma" (2019).

Pseudonym
He originally wrote under the name "Martin Smith", only to discover there were other writers with the same name. His agent asked Smith to add a third name and Smith chose Cruz, his paternal grandmother's surname.

Personal life
Smith lives in San Rafael, California, with his family.

Bibliography

Romano Grey books
(as Martin Smith)
Gypsy in Amber New York: Putnam, [1971] 
Canto for a Gypsy New York: Putnam, [1972]

The Inquisitor Series
(as Simon Quinn)
The Devil in Kansas (1974) (The Inquisitor Series #1)
The Last Time I Saw Hell (1974) (The Inquisitor Series #2)
Nuplex Red (1974) (The Inquisitor Series #3)
His Eminence, Death (1974) (The Inquisitor Series #4)
The Midas Coffin (1975) (The Inquisitor Series #5)
Last Rites for the Vulture (1975) (The Inquisitor Series #6)

Arkady Renko books
Gorky Park New York: Random House, 1981 
Polar Star New York: Random House, 1989 
Red Square New York: Random House, 1992 
Havana Bay New York: Random House, 1999 
Wolves Eat Dogs New York: Simon & Schuster, 2004 
Stalin's Ghost New York: Simon & Schuster, 2007 
Three Stations New York: Simon & Schuster, 2010 
Tatiana New York: Simon & Schuster, 2013 
The Siberian Dilemma New York: Simon & Schuster, 2019

Other books
The Indians Won (1970)
The Analog Bullet (1972)
Inca Death Squad (1972) (as Nick Carter)
The Devil's Dozen (1973) (as Nick Carter) 
Code Name: Werewolf (1973) (as Nick Carter)
The Human Factor (1975) (as Simon Quinn)
The Wilderness Family (1975) (as Martin Quinn)
North to Dakota (a Slocum western) (1976) (as Jake Logan)
Ride for Revenge (a Slocum western) (1977) (as Jake Logan)
Nightwing (1977)
Stallion Gate (1986). 
Rose (1996)
December 6 (2002) (also published as Tokyo Station)
The Girl from Venice (2016)

References

External links

 
 

1942 births
20th-century American novelists
21st-century American novelists
American male novelists
American male screenwriters
American mystery writers
American thriller writers
American alternate history writers
Living people

Native American novelists
Novelists from Pennsylvania
University of Pennsylvania alumni
Writers from San Rafael, California
Writers from Reading, Pennsylvania
Germantown Academy alumni
20th-century American male writers
21st-century American male writers
Screenwriters from California
Screenwriters from Pennsylvania
American people of Yaqui descent
Pueblo people
Yaqui people
Native American people from Pennsylvania